Ayushman Bhava may refer to:

Ayushman Bhava (1998 film), an Indian Malayalam film
Ayushman Bhava (2019 film), an Indian Kannada film
Ayushman Bhava (TV series), a 2017 Indian Hindi television series